Gnarly refers to the state of featuring gnarled components or limbs such as in Cypress trees. It may also be:

 Gnarly (slang), within surf subculture
 Gnarly Davidson, an alter ego of CeeLo Green
 Gnarly (song), the fourth track on the Dying to Live album

See also
 Gnarly Barley Brewing Company
 The Gnarly Man, a science fiction story by American writer L. Sprague de Camp
 Gnarly Buttons,  a composition for solo clarinet and chamber ensemble by the American composer John Adams.